Metrotrans is a bus operated by TransJakarta. Introduced in 2017, replacing aging MetroMini and Kopaja buses, The Metrotrans bus design is based on European-styled low floor bus.

Types
 Mercedes Benz O500 1726, Laksana Cityline2-bodied bus.
 Scania K250UB, Laksana Cityline2-bodied bus.
 Mercedes Benz O500 1726, Nusantara Gemilang-bodied bus.

See also
TransJakarta
Minitrans
Royaltrans

References

Buses